Gigantomilax is a genus of gastropods belonging to the family Limacidae.

The species of this genus are found in Mediterranean and Western Asia.

Species:

Gigantomilax benjaminus 
Gigantomilax borschomensis 
Gigantomilax brunneus 
Gigantomilax cecconii 
Gigantomilax daghestanus 
Gigantomilax koenigi 
Gigantomilax lederi 
Gigantomilax lenkoranus 
Gigantomilax majoricensis 
Gigantomilax monticola 
Gigantomilax occidentalis

References

Gastropods